Tollan, Tolan, or Tolán is a name used for the capital cities of two empires of Pre-Columbian Mesoamerica; first for Teotihuacan, and later for the Toltec capital, Tula, both in Mexico. The name has also been applied to the Postclassic Mexican settlement Cholula.

The name Tōllān means "Among the reeds" in the Nahuatl language, with the figurative sense of a densely populated "place where people are thick as reeds". Names with the same meaning were used in Maya and other native Mexican languages.

Teotihuacan seems to have been the first city known by this name. After the collapse of the Teotihuacan empire, central Mexico broke into smaller states. The Toltec created the first sizable Mexican empire after the fall of Teotihuacan, and their capital was referred to by the same name as a reference to the earlier greatness of Teotihuacan.

In Aztec accounts at the time of the arrival of the Conquistadores, Teotihuacan and the Toltec capital sometimes seem to be confused and conflated.

The epithet "Tollan" was also sometimes applied to any great metropolis or capital. Cholula, for example, was sometimes called "Tollan Cholula", and the Aztec capital of Tenochtitlán was likewise given the title "Tollan".  The Mixtec translation of this, Ñuu Co'yo is still the Mixtec name for Mexico City to this day.

Tollan in Mesoamerican mythology
Tollan is the name given to the mythical place of origin in many Mesoamerican traditions, including those of the Aztecs and the K'iche' Maya. In the K'iche' epic Popol Vuh, the first people created are gathered at Tollan, the place of seven caves, where they receive their languages and their gods.

See also
 Chalchiuhtlatonac (Tollan)

Notes

References

Mesoamerican sites
Locations in Aztec mythology
Locations in Mesoamerican mythology